Smithsonian Butte is a  elevation summit located in the Canaan Mountain Wilderness of Washington County in southwest Utah, United States.

Description

Topographic relief is significant as it rises  in one mile on its south side, and 3,000 feet in three miles above the Virgin River on its north aspect which drains precipitation runoff from this mountain. Its nearest higher neighbor is Zion Butte,  to the southeast, and Eagle Crags are four miles to the east-northeast. The uppermost part of this mountain is composed of light-colored Jurassic Navajo Sandstone which overlays the deep-red sandstone of the Kayenta Formation. This geographical feature was named by geologist Clarence Edward Dutton (1841–1912)]] for the Smithsonian Institution which had sponsored an exploration of the region, and the name was officially adopted in 1934 by the U.S. Board on Geographic Names. From 1875 to 1877, Dutton's field party mapped  of the high plateaus of southern Utah. The saddle between Smithsonian Butte and its parent Caanan Mountain is named Dutton Pass, after him. Access to this mountain is via the Smithsonian Butte National Back Country Byway.

Gallery

Climate
Spring and fall are the most favorable seasons to visit Smithsonian Butte. According to the Köppen climate classification system, it is located in a Cold semi-arid climate zone, which is defined by the coldest month having an average mean temperature below , and at least 50% of the total annual precipitation being received during the spring and summer.

See also

 Geology of the Zion and Kolob canyons area
 Colorado Plateau

References

External links

 Weather: Smithsonian Butte

Mountains of Utah
Mountains of Washington County, Utah
Sandstone formations of the United States
Colorado Plateau
North American 2000 m summits